is a shopping district in Chuo-ku, Kobe, Japan. Kobe Port Tower is located there.

This shopping district was made on the site of the former freight yard, Minatogawa Kamotsu Station of the Japanese National Railways. The yard was removed in 1982 and the shopping district opened in 1992.

Access
JR Kobe Station
Kosoku Kobe Station
Harborland Station

See also
Port of Kobe

References

Kobe Harborland Official Homepage

Shopping districts and streets in Japan
Tourist attractions in Kobe
Geography of Kobe
Redeveloped ports and waterfronts in Japan